David Patrick may refer to:

 David M. Patrick (born 1947), English organist
 David Patrick (basketball) (born 1976), Australian basketball coach
 David Patrick (cricketer) (1886-1968), New Zealand cricketer
 David Patrick (sprinter) (born 1960), American hurdler
 David Patrick (writer) (1849–1914), Scottish writer and editor